The 2018 Eastern Illinois Panthers football team represented Eastern Illinois University as a member of the Ohio Valley Conference (OVC) during the 2018 NCAA Division I FCS football season. Led by Kim Dameron in his fifth and final season as head coach, the Panthers compiled an overall record of 3–8 overall with a mark of 3–5 in conference play, tying for sixth place in the OVC. Eastern Illinois played home games at O'Brien Field in Charleston, Illinois.

On November 18, Dameron was fired. He finished his tenure at Eastern Illinois with a five-year record of 27–30.

Previous season
The Panthers finished the 2017 season 6–5, 5–3 in OVC play to finish in third place.

Preseason

OVC media poll
On July 20, 2018, the media covering the OVC released their preseason poll with the Panthers predicted to finish in fifth place. On July 23, the OVC released their coaches poll with the Panthers predicted to finish in fourth place.

Preseason All-OVC team
The Panthers had three players selected to the preseason all-OVC team.

Offense
Isaiah Johnson – RB
Alexander Hollins – WR

Defense
Mark Williams – DB

Schedule

Game summaries

at Arkansas

at Illinois State

Indiana State

Tennessee State

at Tennessee Tech

Murray State

at Jacksonville State

UT Martin

at Eastern Kentucky

Austin Peay

at Southeast Missouri State

References

Eastern Illinois
Eastern Illinois Panthers football seasons
Eastern Illinois Panthers football